Douglas Eaton "Froggie" Morrison (February 9, 1893 – April 26, 1973) was an American college football player and colonel. He attended Chattanooga Central High School.

Georgia Tech
Morrison was a prominent running back for John Heisman's Georgia Tech Golden Tornado of the Georgia Institute of Technology. He was captain of the 1915 team, selected All-Southern. He led the team at quarterback for the 222–0 defeat of Cumberland in 1916. Morrison was a catcher on the baseball team. He returned to Tech as an assistant coach in 1933 after serving in World War I and a sixteen-year hiatus from college football.

Retirement
He retired to Trenton, Georgia.

See also 

 List of Georgia Tech Yellow Jackets starting quarterbacks

References

1893 births
1973 deaths
American football halfbacks
American football quarterbacks
Baseball catchers
Georgia Tech Yellow Jackets football coaches
Georgia Tech Yellow Jackets football players
All-Southern college football players
American military personnel of World War I
People from Dade County, Georgia
Sportspeople from  Chattanooga, Tennessee
Players of American football from Tennessee
People from Trenton, Tennessee